Glucosyl-3-phosphoglycerate phosphatase (EC 3.1.3.85, GpgP protein) is an enzyme with systematic name α-D-glucosyl-3-phospho-D-glycerate phosphohydrolase. This enzyme catalyses the following chemical reaction

 2-O-(α-D-glucopyranosyl)-3-phospho-D-glycerate + H2O    2-O-(α-D-glucopyranosyl)-D-glycerate + phosphate

The enzyme is involved in biosynthesis of 2-O-(α-D-glucopyranosyl)-D-glycerate.

References

External links 
 

EC 3.1.3